Harttia absaberi is a species of armored catfish  where it is found in the upper rio Paraná drainage in Brazil.

Etymology
The catfish is named in honor of geographer Aziz Nacib Ab’Sáber (1924-2012).

References 

absaberi
Fish of Brazil
Taxa named by Osvaldo Takeshi Oyakawa
Taxa named by Ilana Fichberg
Taxa named by Francisco Langeani-Neto
Fish described in 2013
Catfish of South America